Rape is a common topic in history and mythology. A list of notable survivors from history and mythology includes:

History
 Boudica's two daughters, raped by Roman soldiers
 Rogneda of Polotsk from Belarus/Scandinavian history; raped by Vladimir, half-brother of her betrothed Yaropolk I of Kiev, in the presence of her parents (10th century)
 Li Zu'e - an Empress raped by her brother-in-law and became pregnant
 Artemisia Gentileschi (1593-c. 1656), Italian Baroque artist
 Xenia Borisovna, Russian princess, forcibly taken as a concubine by False Dmitry I

Mythology

Christian
 Agnes of Rome; a young girl of around 12 or 13 years of age, who consecrated her virginity to Christ, and was dragged to a brothel to be raped, in a bid to make her recant her Christian faith.

Greek mythology

Female
 Alcippe a daughter of Ares; raped by Halirrhothius, the son of Poseidon.
 Alcmene; raped by Zeus in form of her husband Amphitryon, resulting in the birth of Heracles.
 Apemosyne; raped by Hermes, after slipping on skinned hides that he placed on her path.
 Atalanta; raped by Hippomenes when they married.
 Auge; raped by Heracles.
 Aura; raped by Dionysus while she was drunk.
 Callisto; raped by Zeus in the form of Artemis or Apollo, resulting in the birth of Arcas.
 Cassandra; raped by Ajax the Lesser during the Sack of Troy.
Chione; raped by Hermes in her sleep.
 Cassiopeia; raped by Zeus in the form of her husband Phoenix.
 Cyrene; raped by Apollo in the form of a wolf.
 Danae; raped by Zeus in the form of golden rain, resulting in the birth of Perseus.
 Demeter; according to an Arcadian myth, Demeter was being pursued by her brother Poseidon, and she changed into a horse to escape him. Poseidon, however, transformed himself into a horse and, after cornering Demeter, raped his older sister, resulting in her giving birth to Despoina, a mysterious  goddess, and Arion, a divine horse.
 Dryope; raped by Apollo in the form of a snake.
 Europa; abducted by Zeus in the form of a white bull, then raped, resulting in the birth of Minos.
 Halie; a Rhodian woman raped by her own sons.
 Harpalyce; raped by her own father.
 Hera; raped by her brother (and later husband) Zeus.
 Io; pursued and eventually raped by Zeus, transformed into a heifer.
 Leda, raped by Zeus in the form of a swan. This resulted in the birth of Helen of Troy.
 Liriope; raped by the river god Cephissus.
 Medusa; raped by Poseidon, resulting in the eventual birth of Pegasus.
 Metis; pursued and eventually raped by her cousin (and later husband) Zeus, resulting in the eventual birth of Athena.
 Nemesis; raped by Zeus, who relentlessly pursued her, changing many forms. In some versions, Nemesis is the mother of Helen of Troy rather than Leda.
 Nicaea; raped by Dionysus while she was unconscious. 
 Persephone; raped by her uncle Hades and in Orphic tradition by her father Zeus disguised as a snake or as Hades himself.
 Philomela; raped by her brother-in-law Tereus.
Procris; raped by Minos.
 Rhea; raped by her son Zeus.
 Tyro; raped by Poseidon in the form of her beloved, the river-god Enipeus.

Male
 Hermaphroditos; raped by (and later merged with) the nymph Salmacis.
 Bellerophon; raped by (and later accused of doing the same by) Anteia.
 Odysseus; in some versions, raped by Calypso on the island of Ogygia in his seven year stay.
 Silenus; raped by the cyclops Polyphemus.
 Chrysippus of Elis; raped by King Laius of Thebes, father of Oedipus by Jocasta, and author of the Laius complex in psychodynamic theory.
 Ganymede raped by Zeus
 Cinyras raped by his daughter, Myrrha, by deception and alcohol.
 Endymion raped by Selene as he slept.
 Hylas raped by naiads.
 Adonis; in some versions, raped by Aphrodite.
 Caeneus raped when he was biologically female by Poseidon.

Hebrew Bible
 Noah; mocked by Ham, in some interpretations he is either raped by him or by Canaan, his son and grandson respectively. 
 Dinah; raped by a Canaanite prince and avenged by her brothers.
 Lot; seduced by his daughters by means of alcohol
 Tamar; raped by her half-brother Amnon and avenged by her brother Absalom.

Norse mythology
 Rindr; raped by Odin in Saxo Grammaticus' version of the engendering of Baldr's avenger

Roman mythology
 Lucretia; raped by a prince, Sextus Tarquinius.
 The Sabine women; raped by the founders of Rome
 Rhea Silvia, raped by Mars.
 Medusa; raped by Neptune in Minerva's temple, as the rape happens in Ovid's version.
 Lara; raped by Mercury as he escorted her to the Underworld.
 Caeneus; formerly known as Caenis raped by Neptune in Ovid's version.
 Endymion; raped by Selene while he was sleeping.

Knights of the Round Table
 Lancelot; Elaine of Corbenic posed as Guinevere to perform a rape by deception upon him.

Medieval Folklore
Eve raped by Lilith, in the form of snake

Adam raped by Lilith in the form of Eve

Hindu Mythology 
Ahalya seduced by Indra, the king of gods

Rambha raped by Ravana 

Araja raped by Danda

See also 

 Sexual consent

References 

Mythology-related lists
Lists of victims of crimes
 
Mythology